Carex brongniartii is a tussock-forming species of perennial sedge in the family Cyperaceae. It is native to parts of South America.

See also
List of Carex species

References

brongniartii
Plants described in 1837
Taxa named by Carl Sigismund Kunth
Flora of Uruguay
Flora of Brazil
Flora of Chile
Flora of Argentina